"Pick Me Up on Your Way Down" is a song written by Harlan Howard, sung by Charlie Walker, and released on the Columbia label. 

Harlan Howard, while living in a frame house in Gardena, California, played the song for another songwriter, Lance Guynes. Guynes offered to send the song to Nashville, and shortly thereafter, Howard received a call from Ray Price saying he loved the song. There was a fight between Price, Ernest Tubb, and Charlie Walker over who would get to record the song. They ultimately agreed to give it to Walker, "because he needed a hit."

In October 1958, the song peaked at No. 2 on Billboards weekly country and western chart. It spent 22 weeks on the charts and was also ranked No. 44 on Billboards 1958 year-end country and western chart.

See also
 Billboard year-end top 50 country & western singles of 1958

References

American country music songs
1958 songs